The 2015–16 Missouri State Lady Bears basketball team represented Missouri State University during the 2015–16 NCAA Division I women's basketball season. The Lady Bears, led by third year head coach Kellie Harper, played their home games at JQH Arena and were members of the Missouri Valley Conference. They finished the season 24–10, 14–4 in MVC play to finish in a tie for second place. They won the Missouri Valley women's tournament to earn an automatic trip to the NCAA Women's Basketball where they lost to Texas A&M in the first round.

Roster

Schedule

|-
! colspan="9" style="background:maroon; color:#fff;"| Exhibition

|-
! colspan="9" style="background:maroon; color:#fff;"| Non-conference regular season

|-
! colspan="9" style="background:maroon; color:#fff;"| Missouri Valley regular season

|-
! colspan="9" style="background:maroon; color:#fff;"| Missouri Valley Women's Tournament

|-
! colspan="9" style="background:maroon; color:#fff;"| NCAA Women's Tournament

See also
2015–16 Missouri State Bears basketball team

References

Missouri State Lady Bears basketball seasons
Missouri State
Missouri State
2015 in sports in Missouri
2016 in sports in Missouri